Franz Engelbert Josef Maria Seibertz (22 February 1856, Brilon - 17 February 1929, Berlin) was a historicist German architect.

References

External links 

 Engelbert Seibertz : artist file from the Frick Art Reference Library

19th-century German architects
20th-century German architects
People from Brilon
1856 births
1929 deaths